The Tribunal of Inquiry into the Beef Processing Industry, also known as the Beef Tribunal, was established on 31 May 1991, chaired by Mr. Justice Liam Hamilton. It was set up to inquire into malpractice in the Irish beef processing industry, mainly centred on Goodman International, owned and controlled by Larry Goodman. It also examined accusations of special dispensations given by the then Minister for Industry and Commerce, Albert Reynolds, to Goodman.

The Tribunal began hearings on 21 June 1991 and it reported its conclusions in July 1994, at the time Ireland's longest-running inquiry.

Establishment
The Tribunal was established by the then Fianna Fáil/Progressive Democrats coalition, though only after the leader of the PDs, Des O'Malley threatened to pull out of the coalition if no inquiry was established. Taoiseach Charles Haughey acquiesced to the demand.

The Tribunal was tasked with "inquiring into the following definite matters of urgent public importance: (i) allegations regarding illegal activities, fraud and malpractice in and in connection with the beef processing industry made or referred to:-- (a) in Dáil Éireann, and (b) on a television programme transmitted by ITV on 13 May 1991; (ii) any matters connected with or relevant to the matters aforesaid which the Tribunal considers it necessary to investigate in connection with its inquiries into the matters mentioned at (i) above; and 2. making such recommendations (if any) as the Tribunal, having regard to its findings, thinks proper."

The allegations

The Tribunal came weeks after the broadcast of a World in Action programme. The allegations made in Dáil Éireann covered many of the allegations made in the television programme and included the following:

Abuses of the system under which subsidies are paid by the EEC to those engaged in the beef processing industry
Failure of regulatory authorities and allegations of political influence in relation to alleged abuses of the system
Tax evasion and Political influence in regard thereto
Goodman, the Industrial Development Authority and political influence
Abuse of Export Credit Insurance Scheme
Allegations of political influence

Conclusions and legacy
The Beef Tribunal concluded that tax evasion occurred at Goodman International and shone a light on widespread improper relationships between the beef industry, particularly Goodman, and the government. However, no criminal charges were brought, aside from the journalist Susan O'Keefe who was charged and acquitted for not revealing sources.

Though not directly charged with wrongdoing, Albert Reynolds's government was ultimately brought down by the fallout of the Beef Tribunal.

Ten years later, Fintan O'Toole commented that while a "shocking set of scandals" were uncovered (including the aforementioned tax evasion, fraud, and theft), "virtually nothing happened", eroding public trust in the system.

References

Further reading

Agriculture in Ireland
Public inquiries in Ireland
1991 in Ireland
1992 in Ireland
1993 in Ireland
1994 in Ireland